Maxamed Daahir Afrax Ph. D. is a Somali novelist, playwright, journalist and scholar.

Biography
Afrax was born and raised in Somalia. He began his education early as a child and was an excellent student top of his class.

A polyglot, he writes in Somali, Arabic and English. Afrax has published three novels in Somali, Guur-ku-sheeg (1975), Maana-faay (1979) and Galti-macruuf (1980), in addition to an historical novel in Arabic, Nida Al-Horiyah (1976). He has also published several short stories in both Arabic and Somali.

Also a playwright, Afrax has written two plays, the first being Durbaan Been ah ("A Deceptive Dream"), which was staged in Somalia in 1979. His major contribution in the field of theatre criticism is Somali Drama: Historical and Critical Study (1987).

In his novels and plays, Afrax denounces moral corruption and social injustice. When in 1980 his novel Gulti-macruuf ("Pseudo-civilized") began to appear in serialized form in Xiddigta Oktoobar (a leading national daily newspaper at the time), Somalia's government took offence. The publication of the story was subsequently discontinued at its 37th episode. Soon after that, in 1981, Afrax left Somalia and has been living abroad ever since.

Bibliography
Nadaraat fi Athaqaafah As-Soomaaliyah ('An Introduction to Somali Culture', in Arabic). ed. Sharjah, United Arab Emirates, by the Culture and Information Department, U.A.E.
Maana-faay : qiso (a Somali novel) ed.  London : Learning Design, 1997.(first published in 1981) (reportedly the first novel written in romanized Somali script)
 Hal-Abuur : wargeys-xilliyeedka suugaanta & dhaqanka Soomaalida, Hal-Abuur Journal / 1993
The 'Abwaan' as beacon : the centrality of the message in Somali literature with especial reference to the play 'Shabeelnaagoog''', in: Horn of Africa / 2004
New, extensively revised and expanded edition of his book in Somali, Dal Dad Waayey iyo Duni Damiir Beeshay: Soomaaliya Dib ma u Dhalan Doontaa?, 2004 (A Land without Leaders in a World without Conscience: Can Somalia be Resurrected?)Ashakhsiyah Aturathiyah fi Shi'r Hadraawi, in: Al-Hikmah, 135 (Feb.), pp. 44–50.1987A Nation of Poets, or Art-loving People? Some Aspects of the Importance of Literature in Present-day Somali Society, Hal-Abuur: Journal of Somali Literature and Culture, 1:2-4 (Autumn/Winter 1993/4), pp. 32–6., 1994The Mirror of Culture: Somali Dissolution Seen Through Oral literature’, in Ahmed I. Samatar (ed.), The Somali Challenge: from Catastrophe to Renewal, Boulder, CO and London: Lynne Reinner, pp. 233–52., 1994

Further reading
 Prof. Lidwien Kapteijns, Window on Somali Society: The Novels of Maxamed D. Afrax'', HAL-ABUUR, Autumn/Winter issue, 1993/94

See also 
 Nuruddin Farah
 Farah Mohamed Jama Awl
 Jama Musse Jama

References 

Somalian novelists
Somalian dramatists and playwrights
Living people
Year of birth missing (living people)
Somali-language writers